Adam Rudden is a Dublin-based Irish poet, born in May 1983.  His work has been published in poetry periodicals including Poetry Ireland Review, Cyphers, Electric Acorn, Jacobyte Poetry, Agenda and Horizons.
He currently has three collections of poetry published by Lapwing Publications: "Fallen Eyelashes"  (2004),  "Braille lips in the Dark" (2007), "Stopwatch" (2009) and "Solar Winds and Ions" (2011). In March 2012, "Solar Winds and Ions" was made available as a free download on Poetry Ireland's website.

Rudden is the editor of Lapwing Bite Size and also Poem of the Month on his website.

External links 
 Adam Rudden’s Official Website
 Lapwing Publication’s Official Website
 Lapwing Bite Size
 Solar Winds and Ions

Irish poets
1983 births
Living people